Hoành Bồ is a ward of Hạ Long city in Quảng Ninh Province, Vietnam.

Hoành Bồ ward was formerly the township of Trới, the district capital of Hoành Bồ District.

References

Communes of Quảng Ninh province
Populated places in Quảng Ninh province